Tang Chenar (also Romanized as Tang Chenār and Tang-e Chenār) is a village in Tang Chenar Rural District, in the Central District of Mehriz County, Yazd Province, Iran. At the 2006 census, its population was 802, in 234 families.

References 

Populated places in Mehriz County